Burhop is a surname. Notable people with the surname include: 

Charles Burhop (1882–1952), American socialist, cigarmaker, and saloonkeeper
Eric Burhop (1911–1980), Australian physicist and humanitarian

See also
Burhop's Seafood, American company
Burhou